Taguasco is a municipality and town in the Sancti Spíritus Province of Cuba.

Geography

Demographics
In 2004, the municipality of Taguasco had a population of 36,365.

See also
Municipalities of Cuba
List of cities in Cuba

References

External links

Populated places in Sancti Spíritus Province